High School Big Shot is a 1959 film starring Tom Pittman as Marv Grant, a smart high school student whose plans for getting a college scholarship are threatened by his alcoholic father played by Malcolm Atterbury, and his relationship with the most popular girl in school. The plot is remarkably similar to that of Stanley Kubrick's The Killing, released only three years prior. Filmed in 1958 under the title Blood Money, it was released by executive producer Roger Corman as a double feature with T-Bird Gang in his first Filmgroup release.

High School Big Shot was featured on an episode of the comedy series Mystery Science Theater 3000.

Plot

Marv Grant is a high school student who lives with his deadbeat, alcoholic father. At school he begins dating the attractive Betty Alexander (Virginia Aldridge), who eventually manipulates him into writing her English class term paper for her. Marv does this, but the subterfuge is easily uncovered by the professor. Betty fails the class, and the professor withdraws his recommendation from Marv's college application, without which Marv has no chance of earning a scholarship. In anger, Betty throws Marv over and returns to her old boyfriend, Vince, revealing that she had only been using Marv from the beginning.

At his part-time job at the docks, Marv overhears his boss plotting a drug transaction worth $1 million cash. The money will be kept in the office safe prior to the deal. In despair, Marv plots to steal the money, with the help of safecracker Harry March and Sam Tolman, to cure troubles with his father and Betty and he secures $550,000 of the take for himself. He tells Betty about the pending robbery to entice her to marry him, and she apparently accedes. In reality she secretively tasks her boyfriend, Vince, to steal the money from Marv.

Marv and his associates steal the money, but things then go horribly wrong when it's discovered Marv's father has hanged himself, then Vince and two accomplices intervene and shoots Sam, and he is horrified. When Betty arrives on the scene soon afterwards, Vince accuses her of making him do this, and he kills her, too. Vince's accomplices flee, but the police soon arrive where they shoot Vince and the drug importer. Marv is arrested and the money falls into the water, being lost.

Similarities to The Killing

The plot may have been adapted from that of The Killing. In that film, George Peatty (Elisha Cook Jr.) is a window teller at a racetrack. He has a shrewish wife, Sherry (Marie Windsor), who is bitter that he has not delivered on the promises of wealth he made at the time of their marriage. She is also cheating on him.

A veteran criminal approaches George about being the inside man on a $2 million heist at the racetrack. Hoping to please his wife, George agrees, and he also tells her about the robbery. Sherry does not believe him at first, but, once she learns that the robbery is real, she recruits her lover, Val Cannon (Vince Edwards), to steal the money from her husband.

The robbery succeeds, but George and his accomplices are held up by Val and his men. A shootout ensues in which all but George are killed. George goes home to confront his wife, and kills her before dying himself. The last man left with the loot attempts to flee by plane, but the suitcase full of money breaks open on the tarmac and the contents are scattered to the winds.

Production
The film was financed by Roger Corman who was particularly impressed by the performance of Tom Pittman in the lead.

In February 1959 Filmgroup announced they would release ten films. Their first movies were High School Big Shot (1959) and T-Bird Gang (1959) produced by Stanley Bickman.

Mystery Science Theater 3000

In 1994, the film was featured in a sixth-season episode of the movie-parody series Mystery Science Theater 3000. The main topics of ridicule were Marv's wimpy demeanor, huge lips and awkward appearance, his father's pathetic alcoholism, and the overall bleak nature of the film. There was also a running gag involving Tom Servo singing "Don't Pay the Ferryman" whenever characters reached the car ferry, leading to Mike Nelson throwing him across the theater out of frustration.

The ending in particular prompted the writers to dub it "one of the most depressing films we've ever seen" and include a skit where the characters of the show "kill" each other with water guns to mock the fact that most of the major characters were killed in a brief moment of time, nearly one after the other.

See also
 List of American films of 1959

References

External links
 
 

1959 films
1959 directorial debut films
1959 crime drama films
American black-and-white films
American crime drama films
American high school films
Films scored by Gerald Fried
1950s English-language films
1950s American films